Fields Avenue may refer to:

 Fields Avenue, The Philippines
 Elysian Fields Avenue, Louisiana